Panjeh Ali Rural District is a rural district (dehestan) in the Central District of Qorveh County, Kurdistan Province, Iran. At the 2006 census, its population was 4,954, in 1,133 families. The rural district has 14 villages.

References 

Rural Districts of Kurdistan Province
Qorveh County